The Three Musketeers is an 1844 novel by Alexandre Dumas. It may also refer to:

Film, stage, and television 
 The Three Musketeers in film, a list of the various film adaptations of the novel
 The Three Musketeers (1921 film), a silent film starring Douglas Fairbanks, Léon Bary, Eugene Pallette and George Siegmann, produced by Douglas Fairbanks
 The Three Musketeers (musical), a musical first performed in 1928
 The Three Musketeers (1966 TV series), a 1966 British television serial produced by the BBC for BBC One
 The Three Musketeers (American TV series), a 1968–1969 American animated television series produced by Hanna-Barbera Productions for NBC
 The Three Musketeers (1973 animated film), a 1973 animated television special produced by Hanna-Barbera Productions
The Three Musketeers (1973 live-action film), a 1973 live-action film starring Michael York, Charlton Heston and Raquel Welch
 The Three Musketeers Anime, a 1987 Japanese animated television series broadcast on NHK
 The Three Musketeers (1993 film), a 1993 Austrian-American action-adventure comedy film produced by Walt Disney Pictures
 The Three Musketeers (2009 TV series), a 2009–2010 Japanese puppetry television series broadcast on NHK
  The Three Musketeers (2011 film), a 2011 American/German romantic action-adventure film.
 The Three Musketeers (2013 film), a 2013 Russian film and television miniseries
 The Three Musketeers (South Korean TV series), a 2014 South Korean television series
 "The Three Musketeers", eleventh episode in 2009 of the American television series Jonas
 Mickey, Donald, Goofy: The Three Musketeers, a 2004 animated Disney comedy film
 The Musketeers, a BBC historical-action drama series based upon the eponymous characters from Alexandre Dumas's novel

Games 
 Three Musketeers (game), a board game published in 1969
 The Three Musketeers (1987 video game), a 1987 game based on the novel
 The Three Musketeers (2006 video game), a Swedish game based on the novel
 The Three Musketeers: One for all!, a 2009 game based on the novel for the WiiWare

Groups 
 The Three Musketeers (Supreme Court), the nickname of Justices Louis Brandeis, Benjamin Cardozo and Harlan Fiske Stone during the 1930s
 The Three Musketeers (Studebaker engineers), the nickname given to three young engineers who started collaborative partnership at Studebaker in 1914
 The Three Musketeers (professional wrestling)", nickname for Japanese wrestlers Shinya Hashimoto, Masahiro Chono, and Keiji Mutoh

Other uses 
The Three Musketeers (Kipling), an 1888 short story by Rudyard Kipling
 3 Musketeers (chocolate bar), a chocolate candy bar released in 1932

See also 
Dogtanian and the Three Muskehounds - a 1981 Japanese animation based on the series